Hartford S.C. was an American soccer club based in Hartford, Connecticut that was a member of the American Soccer League. Champions in 1964-65 led by coach of the year Paul Pantano 

For the 1966/67 and 1968 seasons the team was known as the Hartford Kings.

Year-by-year

American Soccer League (1933–1983) teams
S.C
Defunct soccer clubs in Connecticut
1964 establishments in Connecticut
1968 disestablishments in Connecticut
Association football clubs established in 1964
Association football clubs disestablished in 1968